Madaesan is a mountain of North Korea. It has an elevation of 1,745 metres. It stands between Changjin County and Yonggwang County in South Hamgyong Province.

See also
List of mountains of Korea

References

Mountains of North Korea